This is a list of current presiding officers of the legislative assemblies of sovereign and unrecognized states, autonomous regions, dependencies and other territories, sui generis entities, and international organisations.

States recognised by the United Nations

States recognised by at least one United Nations member

States not recognised by any United Nations members and governments in exile

Autonomous regions, dependencies and other territories

Sui generis entities

International organisations

There are several international parliaments, some that are directly elected and some that are appointed from among member states respective legislatures in the form of an inter-parliamentary institution.

See also
List of legislatures by country
List of current dependent territory leaders
List of current defence ministers
List of current finance ministers
List of current foreign ministers
List of current heads of state and government
List of current interior ministers
List of current Permanent Representatives to the United Nations
List of current state leaders by date of assumption of office
List of current vice presidents
List of heads of state by diplomatic precedence
List of spouses of heads of state
List of state leaders by year
Lists of office-holders

Notes

External links
Inter-Parliamentary Union

Presidents of assembly